Meshullam Zalman Schachter-Shalomi (28 August 1924 – 3 July 2014), commonly called "Reb Zalman", was one of the founders of the Jewish Renewal movement and an innovator in ecumenical dialogue.

Early life
Born Meshullam Zalman Schachter in 1924 to Shlomo and Hayyah Gittel Schachter in Żółkiew, Poland (now Ukraine), Schachter was raised in Vienna, Austria. His father was a liberal Belzer hasid and had Zalman educated at both a Zionist high school and an Orthodox yeshiva. Schachter was interned in detention camps under the Vichy French and fled the Nazi advance by fleeing to the United States in 1941. He was ordained as an Orthodox rabbi in 1947 within the Chabad Lubavitch Hasidic community while under the leadership of the sixth Lubavitcher Rebbe, Yosef Yitzchok Schneersohn, and served Chabad congregations in Massachusetts and Connecticut.

In 1948, along with Rabbi Shlomo Carlebach, Schachter was initially sent out to speak on college campuses by the Lubavitcher Rebbe Menachem Mendel Schneerson. In 1958, Schachter privately published what may have been the first English book on Jewish meditation. It was later reprinted in The Jewish Catalog, and was read by a generation of Jews and as well as some Christian contemplatives. Schachter left the Lubavitcher movement after experimenting with "the sacramental value of lysergic acid" from 1962. With subsequent rise of the hippie movement in the 1960s, and exposure to Christian mysticism, he moved away from the Chabad lifestyle.

Career and work

From 1956 to 1975, Reb Zalman was based in Winnipeg, Manitoba, though he travelled extensively. In Winnipeg, he worked as Hillel director and as head of Judaic Studies at the University of Manitoba. These positions allowed him to share his ideas and experiential techniques of spirituality with many Jewish and non-Jewish students, leaving lasting memories. While pursuing a course of study at Boston University (including a class taught by Howard Thurman), he experienced an intellectual and spiritual shift. In 1968, on sabbatical from the Religion department of the University of Manitoba, he joined a group of other Jews in founding a havurah (small cooperative congregation) in Somerville, Massachusetts, called Havurat Shalom. In 1974, Schachter hosted a month-long Kabbalah workshop in Berkeley, California; his experimental style and the inclusion of mystical and cross-cultural ideas are credited as the inspiration for the formation of the havurah there that eventually became the Aquarian Minyan congregation. He eventually left the Lubavitch movement altogether, and founded his own organization known as B'nai Or, meaning "Sons of Light," a title he took from the Dead Sea Scrolls writings. During this period he was known to his followers as the "B'nai Or Rebbe", and the rainbow prayer shawl he designed for his group was known as the "B'nai Or tallit". Both the havurah experiment and B'nai Or came to be seen as the early stirrings of the Jewish Renewal movement. The congregation later changed its name to the more gender neutral, "P'nai Or" meaning "Faces of Light", and it continues under this name.

In the 1980s, Schachter added "Shalomi" (based on the Hebrew word shalom, peace) to his name, as a statement of his desire for peace in Israel and around the world.

In later years, Schachter-Shalomi held the World Wisdom Chair at The Naropa Institute; he was Professor Emeritus at both Naropa and Temple University. He also served on the faculty of the Reconstructionist Rabbinical College, Omega, the NICABM and many other major institutions. He was co-founder with Rabbi Arthur Waskow of ALEPH: Alliance for Jewish Renewal, bringing together P'nai Or and The Shalom Center, and founder of the ALEPH Ordination Programs. The seminary he founded has ordained over 80 rabbis and cantors.

Schachter-Shalomi was among the group of rabbis, from a wide range of Jewish denominations, who traveled together to India to meet with the Dalai Lama and discuss diaspora survival for Jews and Tibetan Buddhists with him. Tibetans, exiled from their homeland for more than three generations, face some of the same assimilation challenges experienced by Jewish diaspora. The Dalai Lama was interested in knowing how the Jews had survived with their culture intact. That journey was chronicled in Rodger Kamenetz' 1994 book The Jew in the Lotus.

Themes and innovations
Schachter-Shalomi's work reflects several recurring themes, including:

"Paradigm shifts" within Judaism
 New approaches to halakha (Jewish law) including "psycho-halakha" (as of 2007, called "integral halakha") and doctrines like eco-kashrut
The importance of interfaith dialogue and "deep ecumenism" (meaningful connections between traditions)
 "Four Worlds" Judaism (integrating the Physical, Emotional, Intellectual, and Spiritual realms)

He was committed to the Gaia hypothesis, to feminism, and to full inclusion of LGBT people within Judaism. His innovations in Jewish worship include chanting prayers in English while retaining the traditional Hebrew structures and melodies, engaging  (worshipers) in theological dialogue, leading meditation during services and the introduction of spontaneous movement and dance. Many of these techniques have also found their way into the more mainstream Jewish community.

Schachter-Shalomi encouraged diversity among his students and urged them to bring their own talents, vision, views and social justice values to the study and practice of Judaism. Based on the Hasidic writings of Rabbi Mordechai Yosef Leiner of Izbitz, he taught that anything, even what others consider sin and heresy, could be God's will.

His major academic work, Spiritual Intimacy: A study of Counseling in Hasidism, was the result of his doctoral research into the system of spiritual direction cultivated within Chabad Hasidism. This led to his encouragement of students to study widely in the field of Spiritual Direction (one-on-one counseling) and to innovate contemporary systems to help renew a healthy spirituality in Jewish life. He also pioneered the practice of "spiritual eldering", working with fellow seniors on coming to spiritual terms with aging and becoming mentors for younger adults.

Typology of Hasidic rebbes 
Schachter-Shalomi theorized that the historical Hasidic Rebbes may be viewed as occupying one or several of the following roles or functions in relation to their support of their followers:
 The Rav — This role refers to Hasidic Rebbes who also served as ordained rabbis serving Jewish communities. Examples of this type cited by Schachter-Shalomi include Shmelke of Nikolsburg and Pinchas Horowitz. For some Hasidic Rebbes, such as Chaim Halberstam of Sanz, the term Rav was used instead of Rebbe.
 The Good Jew — This role, known in Yiddish as the Guter Yid, refers to a popular Hasidic Rebbe who is viewed as enjoying God's favor and whose legacies spoke to the conditions of struggling Hasidim. This role was viewed as a continuation of the Talmudic legacy of individuals such as Honi HaMe'agel. Examples of Hasidic Rebbes of this type cited include Aryeh Leib of Shpola and Berishil of Krakow.
 The Seer — This role, known in Hebrew as the Chozeh, refers to a Hasidic Rebbe to whom prophetic powers where ascribed. Examples of this type cited include the Seer of Lublin and his student Tzvi Hirsh of Zidichov.
 The Miracle Worker — This role, known in Hebrew as the Ba'al Mofet, was often assumed by Hasidim to involve expertise in Practical Kabbalah. Examples cited include Ber of Radoshitz.
 The Healer — This role is understood as involving more than mere healing but also involved the expectation that the Hasid would alter his behavior to merit healing.
 The Gaon — A variant of the healer-type was the Talmudic genius (gaon) who could offer blessing through the merit of his Talmudic study. This tradition was not limited to Hasidism but also was applied to non-Hasidic rabbis such as Yechezkel Landau of Prague and the Gaon of Vilna.
 The Son or Grandson of the Tzaddik — This role applied to Hasidic Rebbes who would utilize ancestral merit of a Hasidic predecessor to invoke blessing. In Yiddish, the term eynikl (grandson) would sometimes be used. Often, this role involved the use of petitions at the gravesite of the Hasidic predecessor. Examples cited of this type include Boruch of Medzhybizh who was the grandson of the Baal Shem Tov, the founder of Hasidism.
 The Block Rebbe — This type is viewed to have developed in New York City from 1900 to 1940 and involved a grandfatherly role to local Jewish residents.
 The Kabbalist — This role, also known in Hebrew as the Ba'al M'kubal, involved expertise in the theoretical teachings of Jewish mysticism. Examples cited include Shneur Zalman of Lyady (the founder of Chabad Hasidism), Yisroel Hopstein (the Maggid of Kozhnitz), and Isaac of Komarno.
 The Spiritual Guide — This role, known in Hebrew as the Moreh Derekh ("Teacher of the Path"), reflects the Hasidic notion that Rebbe is the expert on matters of the Love and Fear of God. The Hasidic Rebbe Aharon Roth reportedly insisted on the use of this term. While Schachter-Shalomi notes that Hasidim valued the living guide over the use of books, some Rebbes, such as Shalom Dovber of Lubavitch, wrote various tracts for different types of spiritual seekers.
 The Tzaddik of the Generation — This role, known in Hebrew as Tzaddik HaDor, or Rashey Alafim ("Head of Thousands"), invokes the stature of Biblical leaders and is viewed mystically as the conduit of all blessing for the Jewish people of that generation.

Death
Zalman Schachter-Shalomi died in 2014 at the age of 89.

Honors
Rabbi Zalman Schachter-Shalomi was honored by the New York Open Center in 1997 for his Spiritual Renewal.

In 2012 his book Davening: A Guide to Meaningful Jewish Prayer won the Contemporary Jewish Life and Practice Award (one of the National Jewish Book Awards).

He was also recognized as a shaikh in the Sufi Order of Pir Vilayat Khan in the United States and in the Holy Land.

In 2012, the Unitarian Universalist Starr King School for the Ministry awarded Schachter-Shalomi an honorary doctorate of theology, and he gave a popular series of lectures on the "Emerging Cosmology".

Works
Schachter-Shalomi produced a large body of articles, books, audio and video recordings. His free-association homiletical style, typical of Hasidic-trained rabbis, and his frequent use of psychological terminology and computer metaphors are appreciated by many first-time readers.

His publications include:

Personal life
Schachter-Shalomi was married four times and was the father of 11 children. At his passing, he was survived by his wife of 20 years, Eve Ilsen, along with children, grandchildren and great-grandchildren.

References

External links

Rabbi Zalman Schacter-Shalomi | Full Testimony | USC Shoah Foundation. YouTube video: 3 hours and 45 minutes of his life story
 Articles by Rabbi Zalman Schacter-Shalomi
 
 Index of Works by Rabbi Zalman Schachter Shalomi
 The Reb Zalman Legacy Project
 Patheos interview with Reb Zalman on interfaith dialogue
 Beyond Jewish Triumphalism, an interview with Reb Zalman by Patheos
 Zalman M. Schachter Shalomi Collection, University of Colorado Boulder Libraries

1924 births
2014 deaths
American feminist writers
American Jewish Renewal rabbis
Jewish emigrants from Austria to the United States after the Anschluss
Austrian Orthodox Jews
Boston University alumni
Hebrew Union College – Jewish Institute of Religion alumni
Jewish American writers
Jewish Renewal rabbis
Jews from Galicia (Eastern Europe)
American LGBT rights activists
Male feminists
Naropa University faculty
Rabbis from Vienna
People from Zhovkva
Temple University faculty
Writers from Boulder, Colorado
Orthodox Jewish feminists
20th-century American rabbis
21st-century American rabbis
Polish emigrants to Austria